Made In America Festival is a two-day music festival held every Labor Day weekend on the Benjamin Franklin Parkway in Philadelphia, Pennsylvania. It was first announced by entertainer Shawn "Jay-Z" Carter at Philadelphia Museum of Art on May 14, 2012.

In 2014, the Los Angeles, California edition was added to the Made In America Festival, hence marking the first multi-day music festival staged simultaneously on opposite ends of the United States of America. 

Due to the COVID-19 pandemic, Made In America 2020 was cancelled and fans were asked to keep their tickets for the next year's event.

Made In America Festival usually features a lineup of performers, both established and up-and-coming musicians and artists from various genres including hip hop, R&B, EDM, POP, Latin, and Rock.

Background 

Made in America Festival was founded in 2012 by American rapper, record producer, and business mogul Jay-Z, as a way to bring together music and culture. The inaugural event was held on September 1–2, 2012 on Benjamin Franklin Parkway in Philadelphia. It grossed $5 million in ticket sales and attracted nearly 80,000 people. Philadelphia city officials reported that the festival generated at least $10 million in economic impact for the city and covered all municipal costs associated with the event.

In 2012, Pearl Jam were joined onstage by Jay-Z to perform the song "99 Problems". For their appearance at the festival, the band earned $2 million.

As of 2012, the festival features three stages of live music: Rocky Stage, Liberty Stage, and Freedom Tent (which features primarily electronic music). The festival also features an array of vendors, food trucks, carnival games, refillable water stations, and portable toilets.

In Budweiser's 'Makers of Tomorrow' ad, which promoted the theme of the festival, Jay-Z narrated, "Through all the lines and things that are put in place to divide each other, all like-minded people gather together. We're more curious than ever. We create music to express ourselves. And when the world relates, ya know, that's beautiful things. We're all trading off each other's culture. So no matter what lines you put—country, indie rock, rap—we're all somehow gonna find a way to come together cause the lines and the titles can never keep us apart. This is what we've been. To put that on display for the world is, is just being honest. That's it, that's what it's all about. We are finally living out our creed."

The festival was the subject of the 2013 documentary Made in America, directed by Ron Howard and produced by Brian Grazer and Jay-Z. In a statement to the press, Howard called the documentary "a reflection of the fabric of what it means to be 'Made in America'—what the festival represents, why Jay is doing it and how he relates to each artist."

On April 16, 2014, Jay-Z and Eric Garcetti (the mayor of Los Angeles) held a press conference at Los Angeles City Hall and announced that the Made in America Festival would take place not only in Philadelphia, but in Los Angeles as well during the 2014 Labor Day Weekend. The location of the Los Angeles festival would be Grand Park. "On Labor Day weekend we are going to celebrate our golden state of mind right here in LA with a sellout crowd right on the steps of city hall and into Grand Park," Garcetti said. "The 'Made in America Festival' will attract 50,000 fans Saturday and Sunday. Fans who will inject millions of dollars into the LA economy."

On May 19, 2015, it was announced the festival would return to its original format of being solely held in Philadelphia after disappointing ticket sales from last year's LA edition of the festival. In 2015 Budweiser also replaced its Made In America tour with its new Monument Series. The Monument Series which leads up to the main festival took place at both the Statue of Liberty in New York and the Golden Gate Bridge in San Francisco, California.

The festival went on hiatus in 2020 but resumed in 2021.

Lineups

2023 
The Made In America Festival 2023 will take place on September 2–3 in PA Philadelphia. Kendrick Lamar, Young Nudy, Kenny Mason, Glorilla, Genevieve and more is expected lineup .

2022 
Made in America 2022 was held on September 3-4th at the Benjamin Franklin Parkway in Philadelphia. The 2022 festival was headlined by Bad Bunny and Tyler, The Creator.

Made in America 2022 was the first major event on the Parkway since the shooting at the Fourth of July fireworks that injured two police officers .

2021
Made in America 2021 was held on September 4–5 at the Benjamin Franklin Parkway in Philadelphia. The 2021 festival was headlined by Justin Bieber and Lil Baby.

Rocky Stage
Saturday: Latto, Coi Leray, Baby Keem, Megan Thee Stallion, Lil Baby
Sunday: Freddie Gibbs, Tinashe, Bobby Shmurda, Roddy Ricch, Justin Bieber

Liberty Stage
Saturday: Morray, Griselda, A$AP Ferg, Young Thug, Kehlani
Sunday: EST Gee, 42 Dugg, Lil Durk, Moneybagg Yo, Doja Cat

Tidal Stage
Saturday: Destin Conrad, Maeta, Duke Deuce, Pi'erre Bourne, Kaash Paige, Fivio Foreign, Bia
Sunday: Gbeke, 26AR, Capella Grey, Cazzu, Mozzy, Mariah the Scientist, Fousheé, Lloyd Banks

2019
Made in America 2019 was held on August 31 and September 1 at the Benjamin Franklin Parkway in Philadelphia. The 2019 festival was headlined by Travis Scott and Cardi B.

Rocky Stage
Saturday: Dominic Fike, Bazzi, Anderson .Paak & The Free Nationals, Juice Wrld, Cardi B
Sunday: Jacob Banks, Gucci Mane, James Blake, Travis Scott

Liberty Stage
Saturday: Grace Carter, Pink Sweat$, Jorja Smith, Rosalía, Kaskade
Sunday: Kur, Blueface, Lizzo, Lil Uzi Vert

Freedom Stage
Saturday: Yoshi Flower, Elephante, MadeinTYO, Madlib & Freddie Gibbs, Kayzo
Sunday: Phantoms, Channel Tres, SG Lewis, Hippie Sabotage, Kaytranada

Tidal Stage
Saturday: 99 Neighbors, Calboy, Melii, IDK, Buddy, Jay Critch, Roddy Ricch
Sunday: Charly Bliss, Angelica Vila, Amber Mark, Lil Tecca, D'USSE Palooza, Megan Thee Stallion, DaBaby, Tierra Whack

2018
Made in America 2018 was held on September 1 and 2 in Philadelphia, it was headlined by Nicki Minaj, Kendrick Lamar, and Post Malone and included Gunna, Fat Joe, 6LACK, and Lil Skies.

Rocky Stage
Saturday: Tyla Yaweh, Jessie Reyez, Tekashi 6ix9ine, Fat Joe, Meek Mill, Post Malone
Sunday: City Morgue, Rich the Kid, Belly, Pusha T, Alessia Cara, Kendrick Lamar, Nicki Minaj

Liberty Stage
Saturday: The Driver Era, Preme, Sabrina Claudio, 6lack, Janelle Monáe, Zedd
Sunday: Gunna, Ty Dolla Sign, Lil Skies, Daniel Caesar, Miguel, Diplo

Skate Stage
Saturday: D'usse Palooza, Armani White, Orion Sun, Injury Reserve, Kweku Collins, Saba, Show Me the Body, White Reaper, Code Orange
Sunday: Mir Fontaine, Zahsosaa, Wicca Phase Springs Eternal, Petal, JPEGMafia, ASAP Twelvyy, Turnstile, Hobo Johnson & the LoveMakers

Tidal Stage
Saturday: Amara La Negra, Odie, Trouble, Shoreline Mafia, Saint Jhn, SOB X RBE, Davido, Juice Wrld, BlocBoy JB
Sunday: Buzzy Lee, Saweetie, Maxo Kream, Sheck Wes, Clairo, Jay Park, Jay Rock, Lil B

Freedom Stage
Saturday: Louis Futon, BloodPop, Elohim, Tokimonsta, Snakehips, Louis the Child
Sunday: Lophile, Lost Kings, Anna Lunoe, Jai Wolf, Cashmere Cat, Tchami

2017 
Made in America 2017 was headlined by festival founder Jay-Z, J.Cole and The Chainsmokers.

Rocky Stage
Saturday: Rapsody, Marian Hill, Sampha, Migos, Solange, J. Cole
Sunday: PnB Rock, Kelela, Pusha T, Little Dragon, The Chainsmokers, Jay-Z

Liberty Stage
Saturday: Lizzo, Francis and the Lights, Cardi B, Vic Mensa, Kaskade
Sunday: Broods, Tiwa Savage, 21 Savage, Run the Jewels, Marshmello

Skate Stage
Saturday: Queen of Jeans, Flor, Mt. Joy, Mannequin Pussy, (Sandy) Alex G, J.I.D., EarthGang, Ugly God
Sunday: Busty and the Bass, Public Access T.V., Tommy Genesis, Rob Stone, Japanese Breakfast, Beach Slang, Tigers Jaw, Yung Lean

Tidal Stage
Saturday: Ari Lennox, Karen Rodriguez, Nick Grant, Kodie Shane, Smino, THEY., A Boogie wit da Hoodie, Stormzy
Sunday: Carter Winter, Downtown Boys, Mozart La Para, A R I Z O N A, Jorja Smith, Maleek Berry, Wizkid, Superduperkyle

Freedom Stage
Saturday: DeVault, Kap Slap, London on da Track, Vanic, Dirty South, Salva, Cash Cash
Sunday: Medasin, Burns, Netsky, Green Velvet, Getter, R3hab

2016 

The 2016 edition held in Philadelphia was headlined by Rihanna and Coldplay. 2016 also included DJ Khaled, Martin Garrix, FKA Twigs, Lil Wayne and 2 Chainz, Edward Sharpe, Jamie xx, Travis Scott, Grimes, Chance the Rapper, Edward Sharpe and the Magnetic Zeroes, Madeon, Desiigner, Gary Clark, Jr., A$AP Ferg, Bibi Bourelly, Lil Yachty, Bryson Tiller, Sza, and Levi Carter.

Rocky Stage
Saturday: Lil Uzi Vert, SZA, Bryson Tiller, ColleGrove (2 Chainz x Lil Wayne), Rihanna
Sunday: St. Lucia, Banks & Steelz, Edward Sharpe and the Magnetic Zeros, DJ Khaled, Chance the Rapper, Coldplay

Liberty Stage
Saturday: Dorothy, Justine Skye, A$AP Ferg, Eve, Jamie xx
Sunday: Playboi Carti, Tory Lanez, Gary Clark Jr., Travis Scott, FKA Twigs, Martin Garrix

Freedom Stage
Saturday: NVOY, Chris Malinchak, Sleepy Tom, Anna Lunoe, Tchami, DJ Mustard, Adventure Club
Sunday: What the Duck, SG Lewis, Flat White, Salva, Disciples, Madeon

Skate Stage
Saturday: Symone, Denzel Curry, Porches, Cherry Glazerr, Gallant, Grits & Biscuits, Into It. Over It.
Sunday: From Indian Lakes, Day Wave, Aaron West and the Roaring Twenties, Kevin Devine, Basement, Touché Amoré, Red Letter Day

Tidal Stage
Saturday: C-Kan, Colter Wall, Miya Folick, Manolo Rose, Car Seat Headrest, Levi Carter, Dave East, Fat White Family
Sunday: Honduras, Sophie Beem, Show Me the Body, Kevin Garrett, Sir the Baptist, Bibi Bourelly, Lil Yachty, Kacy Hill, Desiigner

2015 
The 2015 line-up featured and included Beyoncé, The Weeknd, Bassnectar, Modest Mouse, Axwell and Ingrosso, and J. Cole.

Saturday, September 5
Beyoncé
Bassnectar
Meek Mill
Nicki Minaj (Special Guest)
Death Cab For Cutie
Nick Jonas
Duke Dumont
Superheaven
Hop Along
Botnek
Young Rising Sons
Jacob Plant
Ryan Hemsworth
Creepoid
Bass Drum of Death
Mike Floss
Sarah Jaffe
Tanlines
De La Soul
Modest Mouse
Vic Mensa
G-Eazy
DJ Mustard
Earl Sweatshirt
The Struts
Mayaeni
Cedric Gervais
Waxahatchee
Strands of Oaks
Ground Up

Sunday, September 6
The Weeknd
Axwell and Ingrosso
Santigold
Cozz
J. Cole
Big Sean
Future
Hippo Campus
Action Bronson
Mick Jenkins
Halsey
Fabolous
Freeway (Special Guest)
Bizzy Crook
Flatbush Zombies
Lolawolf
Banks
Lili K
Marian Hill
Claude VonStroke
Jidenna
Bully
Metric
Burns
Aeroplane
Saint Motel
Grits & Biscuts
Post Malone
Remy Banks
Omen
Disco Fries
Twin Peaks
Bas
GTA
A-Trak

2014 
In April 2014, it was announced that the 2014 Made in America festival would take place not only in Philadelphia, but also in Los Angeles. A press conference given by Jay-Z and the mayor of Los Angeles, Eric Garcetti, explained how the added location was designed to involve both the west and east coasts of the United States in the multi-genre festival. The 2014 festival reportedly delivered "twice the amount of music" as the previous years of the festival, and also benefitted the United Way of Greater Los Angeles, United Way of Philadelphia and Southern New Jersey, and United Way of Lancaster County.

Philadelphia

Saturday, August 30
Kanye West
The National
J. Cole
Chromeo
Girl Talk
Spoon
Grimes
R3hab
Gareth Emery
Steve Aoki
Kongos
3LAU
The Neighbourhood
Penguin Prison
Destructo
Bleachers
Young & Sick
Vacationer
Holy Ghost!
Cut Snake
The OBGMs

Sunday, August 31
Kings Of Leon
Pharrell Williams
Big Daddy Kane
City And Colour
Awolnation
Baauer
Tommy Trash
Tiesto
Mayer Hawthorne
Danny Brown
YG
Holy Ghost!
DJ Cassidy
Cherub
MisterWives
Will Sparks
CRUISR
Kaneholler

Los Angeles

Saturday, August 30
Imagine Dragons
Kendrick Lamar
Afrojack
Iggy Azalea
Sublime with Rome
Metric
Capital Cities
Gareth Emery
Schoolboy Q
Borgore
DVBBS
YG
Mute Math
Dr. Dog
Hit-Boy
ZZ Ward
Classixx
Ab-Soul
Isaiah Rashad
Jay Rock
Cut Snake
Grandtheft

Sunday, August 31
John Mayer
Kanye West
Juanes
Steve Aoki
Rise Against
Weezer
Chance The Rapper
Cypress Hill
R3hab
Wolfgang Gartner
12th Planet
Rita Ora
Nipsey Hussle
Terraplane Sun
Yellow Claw
Will Sparks
SZA
Scavenger Hunt
A Tribe Called Red

2013 

Saturday, August 31
Beyoncé
Deadmau5
Phoenix
Empire of the Sun
Imagine Dragons
2 Chainz
Public Enemy
A$AP Rocky
Haim
Walk The Moon
Wolfgang Gartner
Porter Robinson
TJR
Rudimental
Redlight
Mord Fustang

Sunday, September 1
Nine Inch Nails
Calvin Harris
Queens of the Stone Age
Macklemore and Ryan Lewis
Wiz Khalifa
Miguel
Kendrick Lamar
Emeli Sandé
The Gaslight Anthem
Fitz and the Tantrums
Feed Me
Schoolboy Q
Solange
Jay Rock
Nero
Robert Delong
Ab-Soul 
GTA
AlunaGeorge
Jesse Rose
Diarrhea Planet

2012 

Saturday, September 1
Jay-Z
Skrillex
Miike Snow
Calvin Harris
Passion Pit
Maybach Music Group (featuring Rick Ross, Wale and Meek Mill)
Gary Clark Jr.
D'Angelo
Dirty Projectors
Nicky Romero
Janelle Monáe
Mariah Carey
Michael Woods
Otto Knows
Savoy
Funkagenda
Prince Royce

Sunday, September 2
Pearl Jam
Drake
Jill Scott
Run-DMC
Gary Clark Jr.
Afrojack
Odd Future
Alesso
Santigold
The Hives
Rita Ora
The Knocks
Burns
DJ Shadow
X 
Betatraxx
Milkman
P.A.W.N. LASER / Louis Capet XXVI

See also
 Made in America (disambiguation)
 Made in USA
 List of festivals in the United States

References

External links
 

Music festivals in Philadelphia
Jay-Z
Music festivals in Los Angeles
Music festivals established in 2012